Louis of France (1264 – Château de Vincennes, before May 1276), was heir apparent to the French throne. He was the eldest son of King Philip III of France and his first wife, Isabella of Aragon.

Life
Louis had three younger brothers: Philip IV the Fair, Robert and Charles. His mother died in Calabria following a riding accident during her pregnancy with her fifth child, in 1270. At his death at the age of 12, his younger brother Philip, succeeded him as heir apparent.

Circumstances of his death
Following his death, Pierre de la Broce, Philip's chamberlain, accused Mary of Brabant, Philip's second wife, of poisoning Louis. By 1277, suspicion had fallen on Pierre de la Broce, who was then tried for treachery, and hanged at Montfaucon.

References

Sources

House of Capet
1264 births
French princes
1276 deaths
Heirs apparent who never acceded
Royalty and nobility who died as children
Sons of kings